Baruch College (officially the Bernard M. Baruch College) is a public college in New York City. It is a constituent college of the City University of New York system. Named for financier and statesman Bernard M. Baruch, the college operates undergraduate and postgraduate programs through the Zicklin School of Business, the Weissman School of Arts and Sciences, and the Marxe School of Public and International Affairs.

History

Baruch College is one of the senior  colleges in the CUNY system. It traces its roots back to the 1847 founding of the Free Academy, the first institution of free public higher education in the United States. The New York State Literature Fund was created to serve students who could not afford to enroll in New York City's private colleges. The Fund led to the creation of the Committee of the Board of Education of the City of New York, led by Townsend Harris, J.S. Bosworth, and John L. Mason, which brought about the establishment of what would become the Free Academy, on Lexington Avenue in Manhattan.

The Free Academy became the College of the City of New York, now The City College of New York (CCNY). In 1919, what would become Baruch College was established as City College School of Business and Civic Administration. On December 15, 1928, the cornerstone was laid on the new building which would house the newly founded school. At this point, the school did not admit women. At the time it opened it was considered the biggest such school for the teaching of business education in the United States.

By the 1930s, women were enrolled in the School of Business. The total enrollment at CCNY reached an all-time high of 40,000 students in 1935, and the School of Business had an enrollment of more than 1,700 students in the day session alone. In 1953, it was renamed the Baruch School of Business in honor of Bernard Baruch, an 1889 graduate of CCNY who went on to become a prominent financier and adviser to two presidents. In 1961, the New York State Education Law established the City University of New York (CUNY) system. In 1968, the Baruch School of Business was spun off as Baruch College, an independent senior college in the CUNY system.

The first president of the new college (1969–1970) was the previous Federal Secretary of Housing and Urban Development Robert C. Weaver. In 1971, the college appointed Clyde Wingfield, a noted educator, as its president. He was succeeded by economist Joel Edwin Segall in 1977. Segall recruited several well-known faculty members to the School of Business and established the college's permanent home on Lower Lexington Avenue. Matthew Goldstein was president of the school from 1991 to 1998 (he later went on to serve as the Chancellor of CUNY from 1999 to 2013). He was responsible for raising admissions requirements and creating the School of Public Affairs in 1994. Edward Regan, former comptroller of New York state, served as president from 2000 to 2004. During his tenure, test scores rose, student retention rates increased, and many new faculty members were hired. In 2001, the Vertical Campus opened and Baruch College accepted its first students from the CUNY Honors College, now known as the Macaulay Honors College. The college also implemented a common core curriculum for all undergraduates.

Kathleen Waldron became the president in 2004. Under Waldron, Baruch College received large donations from its alumni, which resulted in the Vertical Campus, 23rd Street building, and Performing Arts complex being renamed in honor of the three largest donors respectively. Alumni giving has increased under "Baruch Means Business," a $150 million capital campaign. In August 2009, Waldron resigned from her position to become a University Professor at the Graduate Center. Stan Altman, the former dean of the School of Public Affairs from 1999 to 2005, was named interim president.

On February 22, 2010, Mitchel Wallerstein, Dean of the Maxwell School of Citizenship and Public Affairs at Syracuse University, was appointed as the president of the college. He took office on August 2, 2010, and remained until June 30, 2020, after which he became a University Professor at CUNY. Under his leadership, Baruch College established degree programs with universities globally, ranked as a top college for social mobility, and achieved the best graduation rate within the CUNY system.

Baruch College was the scene of student protests in 2011 as a result of tuition hikes. This resulted in arrests.

S. David Wu was appointed as the next President of Baruch College on February 3, 2020, and took office on July 1, 2020.

Presidents of Baruch College

Academics
Baruch College is composed of three academic schools, the Zicklin School of Business, the Weissman School of Arts and Sciences, and the Marxe School of Public and International Affairs.

The Zicklin School of Business grants a Bachelor of Business Administration (BBA) degree in 19 different business-related areas, a Masters of Business Administration (MBA) in 14 business-related areas, and a Masters of Science (MS) in 8 business-related programs.

The Weissman School of Arts and Sciences grants a Bachelor of Arts (BA) degree in over 26 different arts and science-related areas, a Masters of Arts (MA) in Corporate Communications and Mental Health Counseling, and a Masters of Science (MS) in Financial Engineering and Industrial-Organizational Psychology.

The Austin W. Marxe School of Public and International Affairs grants a Bachelor of Science (BS) degree in Public Affairs, a Masters of Public Administration (MPA) in 5 different public affairs-related areas, and a Masters of Science in education (MSEd) in Higher Education Administration.

The college also houses several doctoral (PhD) programs offered through the CUNY Graduate Center. They include Business (with specializations in Accounting, Finance, Information Systems, Marketing or Organizational Behavior) as well as Industrial and Organizational Psychology. As of June 2013, the CUNY PhD in Business degree is offered jointly by the Graduate Center and Baruch College.

Campus

Lawrence and Eris Field Building

The Lawrence and Eris Field Building, also known as the 23rd Street Building, is still in use by the college today. The 23rd Street Building began renovation in 2013. The ten-year renovation project will finally bring the 23rd Street Building to twenty-first century standards. The building is home to the Marxe School of Public and International Affairs and several administrative offices.

Information and Technology Building

The Information and Technology Building, which opened in 1994, is located across East 25th Street from the Newman Vertical Campus. It is home to the William and Anita Newman Library, and features multiple floors with Wi-Fi access and designated "study-pod" areas. A 320-seat computer lab, the Baruch Computing and Technology Center, is on the sixth floor. The building also contains the offices of the Registrar, Undergraduate Admissions, Financial Aid and the International Student Center. It is colloquially known as the "Library Building" by students and staff. It was originally a trolley barn used to store and service New York City streetcars.

Newman Vertical Campus

After decades of renting space for classrooms, the college began construction of what would later be called the Newman Vertical Campus in 1998. It is now home to the Zicklin School of Business and the Weissman School of Arts and Sciences (the Marxe School of Public and International Affairs is housed in the Field Building). It houses classrooms, faculty offices, additional computer labs for student use, along with the Athletic and Recreation Complex (ARC), Cafeteria, and Baruch Bookstore. The Newman Vertical Campus was honored in 2003 by the American Institute of Architects with the highest award it offers to an individual building. East 25th Street between Lexington and Third Avenue was renamed "Bernard Baruch Way", and the college now uses the Vertical Campus as its official address.

Campus location
The college is located between East 22nd and 25th Streets in Manhattan, along Lexington Avenue. The campus is served by the following transportation:
New York City Bus:  routes.

Academic centers and institutes
Baruch College Survey Research
CCI – Corporate Communication International
CUNY Institute for Demographic Research
Center for Educational Leadership
Center on Equality, Pluralism and Policy
Lawrence N. Field Center for Entrepreneurship
Jewish Studies Center
Steven L. Newman Real Estate Institute
New York Census Research Data Center
Center for Nonprofit Strategy and Management
Center for the Study of Business and Government (CSBG)
The Bernard L. Schwartz Communication Institute at Baruch College is an academic service unit and faculty development program. It supports educational technology and communications instructional projects in the college.
The Starr Career Development Center, named after the Starr Foundation, provides career services to all Baruch College undergraduates and alumni with bachelor's degrees from Baruch.
The Subotnick Financial Services Center, which opened in 2000, provides a simulation of practical trading experience. Its centerpiece is the Bert W. and Sandra Wasserman Trading Floor.
Center for Teaching and Learning
Computer Center for Visually Impaired People
Weissman Center for International Business
Robert Zicklin Center for Corporate Integrity

Partnerships
 The Zicklin School of Business:
 has established a corporate-university partnership with JPMorgan Chase.
 maintains a joint JD/MBA program with Brooklyn Law School and New York Law School.
 Baruch College Campus High School is a public high school operated by the New York City Department of Education that is affiliated with the college.
 The Executive Master of Science in finance, and Executive Master of Science in marketing programs at the American Graduate School in Paris are affiliated with Baruch College.

Student life
WBMB Baruch College Radio currently provides around the clock radio broadcasts via their website stream and local FM frequency 94.3. The Ticker has been the student newspaper since 1932. The school is home to over 130 clubs and student organizations, including large chapters of such national and international organizations as Finance and Economics Society, ISACA Cybersecurity Club, ALPFA, AIESEC, Toastmasters, Alpha Kappa Psi, Sigma Alpha Delta, Muslim Student Association, Bangladesh Student Association, United Chinese Language Association, InterVarsity Christian Fellowship, and Golden Key.  Most undergraduate clubs meet on Thursdays between 12:40 p.m. to 2:20 p.m., which is known as “Club Hours.”

Athletics
Baruch College competes in Division III of the National Collegiate Athletic Association. The sports teams, referred to as the Bearcats, are a member of the City University of New York Athletic Conference (CUNYAC). Men's sports include baseball, basketball, cross country, soccer, swimming & diving, tennis and volleyball. Women's sports include basketball, cross country, softball, swimming & diving, tennis and volleyball.

Admissions
The undergraduate admissions for Baruch College are considered to be "Selective" by the College Board with a 43% acceptance rate.  Baruch College follows a holistic admissions process by considering teacher recommendations, application essay, and extracurricular activities, in addition to standardized test scores and GPA. For 2022, the average admitted student's GPA was 3.3, with an SAT score range of 1170–1350 and average ACT score of 27. The college has a 70% graduation rate within six years.

Rankings

Baruch College has been ranked by multiple sources, including:

 In its annual "Social Mobility Index" for 2015, CollegeNet ranked Baruch #1 in the country, among more than 900 schools considered, in providing social mobility for students.
 Washington Monthly ranked Baruch #1 in the Northeast in 2015 in providing "Best Bang for the Buck."
CNBC Says Baruch College is #2 Best Public Institution Nationwide for Return on Investment in 2020.
 Entrepreneur magazine and The Princeton Review ranked Baruch #5 in 2018 among colleges for its undergraduate entrepreneurship program, and #10 for the graduate school.
 Forbes ranked Baruch #9 in the country among "Best Value Schools" for 2019. The magazine also ranked Baruch #55 nationally among "Best Business Schools."
 In 2015, Business Insider recognized Baruch as #19 in its ranking of the 25 business schools that offer the best value.
 U.S. News & World Report ranked Baruch 20th in 2017 among Regional Universities in the North. The magazine also ranked Baruch #4, Most Ethnically Diverse (in the North Region); #5, Top Public Schools (in the North Region); #1, Least Debt (in the North Region); #15, City Management and Urban Policy; #29, Health Care Management; #35, Accounting; #45, Top Public Affairs Schools; #61, Best Undergraduate Business programs; #66, Best Part-time MBA.
U.S. News & World Report, in its 2020 ranking of "Best Business Schools," listed Zicklin as #52 nationally.

Notable people

Alumni
Before 1968, alumni of Baruch College were officially alumni of the City College of New York.

Business 
 Lara Abrash (MBA '94), chairman and CEO, Deloitte & Touche LLP
 William F. Aldinger III (born 1947; '69), chairman and CEO, HSBC North America Holdings
 Anthony Chan (born c. 1957; BBA '79), Chief Economist, JP Morgan Chase Bank, N.A.
 Akis Cleanthous (1964–2011; BBA '88), Former Chairman of the Cyprus Stock Exchange
 Monte Conner ('86), Senior Vice President of Roadrunner Records, A&R department
 Fernando Ferrer (MPA '04), Former Chairman of MTA (New York), former Bronx Borough President
 Sidney Harman (BBA '39), Founder and Chairman Emeritus of Harman International Industries
 Jacqueline Hernández (MBA '96), Former Chief Marketing Officer, NBCUniversal Telemundo
 Robert Holland (MBA '69), Former President and CEO of Ben & Jerry's
 James Lam (BBA '83), Author, Former Chief Risk Officer of GE Capital
 Mayuri Kango (MBA '07), Indian actress, Head of Industry at Google India
 Ralph Lauren (dropped out), Founder and Chairman of Ralph Lauren Corporation
 Dennis Levine (MBA '76), Prominent player in the Wall Street insider trading scandals of the mid-1980s
 Adam Neumann (BBA '17), co-founder and CEO of WeWork
 Oscar N. Onyema (MBA '98), CEO of the Nigerian Stock Exchange
 Rim Ji-hoon (DBA' 22), Former CEO of Kakao Corporation
 Bruce Sherman (MBA '73), chairman and principal owner, Miami Marlins
 Martin Shkreli (BBA '04), Founder and Former CEO of Turing Pharmaceuticals 
 Stuart Subotnick (BBA '62), CEO of Metromedia; one of America's 500 wealthiest people in 2002
 George Weissman (BBA '39), Former Chairman and CEO, Philip Morris International
 Larry Zicklin (BBA '57), Former Chairman of the Board, Neuberger Berman

Politics, government, and law 
 Tony Allen (MPA '98), Chair of the US President's Board of Advisors on Historically Black Colleges and Universities and president of Delaware State University
 Egemen Bağış (MPA '96), Former minister for European Union Affairs, Turkish politician
 Shirley Elizabeth Barnes (BBA '56), Former United States Ambassador to Madagascar
 Abraham Beame (BBA '28), 104th Mayor of New York City
 Vanessa Gibson (MPA '09), Borough President of The Bronx 
 Michael Grimm (BBA '94), Former member of United States House of Representatives for New York's 13th congressional district
 Carl Heastie   (MBA '07), 120th Speaker of the New York State Assembly
 Verna L. Jones (MPA '87), Former member of the Maryland Senate
 Ron Kim (MPA '06), Member of the New York State Assembly
 Melissa Mark-Viverito (MPA '96), Former speaker of the New York City Council
 Cristina Jiménez Moreta (MPA '11), 2017 MacArthur Fellow  
 Daniel A. Nigro (BBA '71), Former Commissioner of the New York City Fire Department (FDNY)  
 Yuh-Line Niou (MPA '11), Member of the New York State Assembly
 Prince (Omubiito) Solomon Michael Okwiri Adyeri Ishagara, Omukama of Kingdom of Toro
 Albert Seedman (BBA '41), Chief of Detectives, New York City Police Department (NYPD)
 Ada L. Smith ('73), Former member of the New York State Senate
 Michael G. Sotirhos (BBA '50), Former United States Ambassador to Greece 
 Carl Spielvogel (BBA '57), Former United States Ambassador to Slovakia
 Craig A. Stanley (MPA '99), Member of New Jersey General Assembly from 1996 to 2008
 Eric Ulrich (MPA '16), Commissioner of the New York City Department of Buildings
 Carolyn Walker-Diallo (MBA '03), Supervising judge, New York City Civil Court
 Grace Helen Whitener (BBA '88), Associate Justice of the Washington Supreme Court
 Leo C. Zeferetti (dropped out), Former member of United States House of Representatives for New York's 15th district

The arts 
 Eddie Carmel, born Oded Ha-Carmeili (1936–1972), Israeli-born entertainer with gigantism and acromegaly, popularly known as "The Jewish Giant"
 Buddy Freitag (1953), Broadway producer (Porgy and Bess, Nice Work If You Can Get It)
 Immortal Technique (dropped out), hip hop recording artist and activist
 Daniel Lobell, American stand-up comedian and podcaster
 Jennifer Lopez, (dropped out), actress, singer, dancer and producer
 Bernie West, (1918-2010, '39), television writer
 Perizaad Zorabian, (MBA '96), Irani-Indian actress
 Tarkan, singer

Literature, journalism, and tech 
 Jack Barsky ('84), German-American author, IT specialist, former KGB spy
 Michael Freeman (MBA '70), American inventor, author
 David Hamilton Golland ('00), American historian and author
 G. Winston James (MBA '05), Jamaican-American poet, activist
 Tsvetta Kaleynska (EMPA ’15), Bulgarian author, TV personality
 Carlos D. Ramirez (1946–1999), Publisher of El Diario La Prensa
 Upton Sinclair, American author (The Jungle, 1906)

Sports 
 Danny Garcia (1972–1975), MLB | 1981 Kansas City Royals Baseball
 Levy Rozman ('17), International Master in chess and online content creator

Faculty
 Ervand Abrahamian, Professor of history, Fellow of the American Academy of Arts and Sciences
 Abraham J. Briloff, Professor of accounting, Inductee of The Accounting Hall of Fame in 2014
 Joel Brind, Professor of biology, Scientific advocate of the abortion–breast cancer hypothesis
 Mario Cuomo, Former 3-term Governor of New York State, Taught a public affairs seminar in the fall of 2008
 Matthew Goldstein, Former chancellor of The City University of New York, Taught mathematics and statistics
David Gruber, Marine biologist and National Geographic Explorer, Presidential Professor of Biology and Environmental Sciences at the City University of New York
 Ted Joyce, Professor of economics, research associate at the National Bureau of Economic Research
 Douglas P. Lackey, Professor of philosophy, playwright
 John Liu, Former New York City Comptroller, mayoral candidate, and former member of the New York City Council, Taught municipal finance and policy in the School of Public Affairs
 Kenneth L. Marcus, Former Assistant Secretary for Civil Rights at the United States Department of Education, Taught courses on Diversity Management and Civil Rights Law
 Harry Markowitz, Professor of Finance, recipient of Nobel Prize in Economics (1990)
 Wendell Pritchett, Chancellor of Rutgers University–Camden, Interim Dean and Presidential Professor at the University of Pennsylvania Law School, and Provost of the University of Pennsylvania
 Carla Robbins, Clinical Professor, Former deputy editorial page editor of The New York Times
 David Rosner, Ronald H. Lauterstein Professor of Sociomedical Sciences and professor of history in the Graduate School of Arts and Sciences at Columbia University; Co-director of the Center for the History and Ethics of Public Health at Columbia's Mailman School of Public Health; member, National Academy of Sciences' Institute of Medicine (class of 2010)
 Donna Shalala, Secretary of Health and Human Services under the Clinton Administration, Taught politics at Baruch in the 1970s
 Clarence Taylor, Emeritus Professor of history
 John Trinkaus, Former Professor of Management and Dean, recipient of Ig Nobel Prize
 Yoshihiro Tsurumi, Professor of international business, scholar in multinational business strategy and national competitiveness

References

External links

 
 Official athletics website
 The Ticker newspaper web site

 
1919 establishments in New York City
Educational institutions established in 1919
Flatiron District
Universities and colleges in Manhattan
Baruch
Bernard Baruch